Echelons is the debut studio album by American post-punk band For Against, released in 1987 by Independent Project Records.

Album cover
The album was nominated for a 1988 Grammy award for Best Album Package - Incl. Album Cover, Graphic Arts, Photography. It was designed by Bruce Licher of Savage Republic.

Critical reception
AllMusic called the album "a spectacular listen" and "one of the most important releases of its time." PopMatters declared it "a fine debut, and a must have for anyone interested in the best of American college rock from the 1980s."

References

External links 

 

1987 debut albums